Henry John Steinbacher (March 22, 1913 – April 3, 1977) was a professional baseball player who played outfield for the Chicago White Sox from 1937 to 1939 seasons. Before debuting in the major leagues, his contract was purchased by Chicago from the St. Louis Browns. In 1938, his only first full season in the major leagues, his batting average ranked seventh best in the American League. On June 22 of that year, he went 6-for-6 against the Senators in a 16-3 win.

See also
List of Major League Baseball single-game hits leaders

External links

1913 births
1977 deaths
Major League Baseball outfielders
Chicago White Sox players
Baseball players from Sacramento, California